Vladimir Fyodorovich Chub (born 24 July 1948) is a Russian politician who served as Governor of Rostov Oblast from 1991 until 2010. He was appointed governor in October 1991 and later that year won an election for the post by a large majority. He was re-elected in 1996 and 2001. He was appointed to the Federation Council in 1993. Prior to his governorship, he was First Secretary of the CPSU committee of Proletarian district of Rostov. He is a member of the United Russia party, formerly a member of NDR, and OKS. His administration takes a strong stance against illegal political activity. Chub is of Ukrainian ancestry.

Honours and awards
 Order of Merit for the Fatherland;
2nd class (24 July 2003) - for outstanding contribution to strengthening Russian statehood and many years of diligent work
3rd class (1 July 1998) - for services to the state and the great personal contribution to the socio-economic transformation
4th class (17 July 2008) - for outstanding contribution to the socio-economic development of the field and many years of honest work
 Order of Honour (7 May 1996) - for services to the state and many years of conscientious work
 Order of Friendship (13 May 2010) - for outstanding contribution to the socio-economic development of the field and many years of honest work
 Order of Honour and Glory, 2nd class (Abkhazia, 2003)
 Order of Akhmad Kadyrov (Chechen Republic)
 Diploma of the Government of the Russian Federation (24 July 2008) - for his great personal contribution to the socio-economic development of the Rostov region and years of diligent work
 Memorial sign "For service in the Caucasus" (a sign of military distinction, established in the Southern Federal District, 2003)
 Breastplate of the "200 Years of Ministry of Internal Affairs of Russia" (Russian Ministry of Internal Affairs, 2003)
 Commemorative Medal "100th Anniversary of birth of the great Russian writer and Nobel Prize winner Mikhail Sholokhov" (Ministry of Culture and Mass Communications of Russian Federation, June 9, 2005) - for active participation in the preparation and holding a series of activities commemorating the 100th anniversary of Mikhail Sholokhov

References

1948 births
Living people
People from Pinsk
Communist Party of the Soviet Union members
Russian people of Belarusian descent
Recipients of the Order "For Merit to the Fatherland", 2nd class
Recipients of the Order of Honour (Russia)
Governors of Rostov Oblast
United Russia politicians
21st-century Russian politicians
Our Home – Russia politicians
20th-century Russian politicians
Members of the Federation Council of Russia (after 2000)